Gouws is a surname. Notable people with the surname include:

Johannes Gouws (1919–1944), South African Air Force officer
Liezel Gouws (born 1999), South African Paralympic athlete
Pierre Gouws (born 1960), Zimbabwean cyclist
Rowan Gouws (born 1995), South African rugby union player

See also
Gouw